Rivo Vesik (born 15 July 1980 in Pärnu) is a former Estonian  beach volleyball player and current beach volleyball coach. With teammate Kristjan Kais, he represented Estonia in beach volleyball at the 2008 Summer Olympics in Beijing, China.

Achievements

Overall FIVB World Tour results

Personal
Vesik was married to Kerttu Vesik (born Talvik) from 2010 to 2017.

References

External links 
 

1980 births
Living people
Sportspeople from Pärnu
Estonian beach volleyball players
Men's beach volleyball players
Beach volleyball players at the 2008 Summer Olympics
Olympic beach volleyball players of Estonia
Beach volleyball players at the 2015 European Games
European Games competitors for Estonia
Estonian sports coaches